Kreshnik Sinanaj (born 31 January 1986) is an Albanian football player.

Club career
The defender allegedly played for KF Tirana in the Albanian Superliga, as well as for Flamurtari, Dinamo Tirana, KS Besa Kavaje, Teuta Durres and KS Kamza.

External links
Profile

1986 births
Living people
Albanian footballers
Association football defenders
Flamurtari Vlorë players
FK Dinamo Tirana players
Besa Kavajë players
KF Teuta Durrës players
FC Kamza players
KF Tirana players
Kategoria Superiore players
Kategoria e Parë players